Féternes is a commune in the Haute-Savoie department in the Auvergne-Rhône-Alpes region in south-eastern France.

Notable citizens 
 Victor Martin (1912-1989) Belgian sociologist and resistant. In 1943 went undercover to Auschwitz camp to bring direct account of its true activities. Retired in Féternes after years at the International Labour Organization.

See also
Communes of the Haute-Savoie department

References

Communes of Haute-Savoie